Antonio Bisigato (July 27, 1911 – March 16, 1965) was an Italian professional football player and coach.

Honours
 Serie A champion: 1937/38.

1911 births
1965 deaths
Italian footballers
Serie A players
Treviso F.B.C. 1993 players
S.S.C. Bari players
S.S. Lazio players
Inter Milan players
Venezia F.C. players
Italian football managers
Treviso F.B.C. 1993 managers
Association football forwards